The Cluster Architecture (CLAR) platform is a car platform developed by BMW.

It is a modular platform that incorporates steel, aluminium, and optional carbon fibre. It is available with rear-wheel drive or all-wheel drive setups and debuted in the G11 7 Series in 2015. It is designed to accommodate a pure ICE drivetrain, has an optional 48-volt electrical system in a mild-hybrid configuration, but also supports plug-in hybrid and battery electric drivetrains.

It was initially called 35up but was later renamed to CLAR. It covers D-segment cars, E-segment cars, F-segment cars, sports cars, SUVs. Smaller BMW cars in the B-segment and C-segment, compact MPV and smaller SUV use the front-wheel drive-based BMW UKL platform instead.

Vehicles 
 BMW 7 Series (G11) (2015–2022)
 BMW 5 Series (G30) (2016–present)
 BMW 6 Series (G32) (2017–present)
 BMW X3 (G01) (2017–present)
 BMW X4 (G02) (2017–present)
 BMW iX3  (G08) (2018-present)
 BMW X5 (G05) (2018–present)
 BMW 8 Series (G15) (2018–present)
 BMW Z4 (G29) (2018–present)  
 BMW 3 Series (G20) (2018–present)
 BMW X7 (G07) (2019–present)
 Toyota Supra (J29/DB) (2019–present) 
 BMW X6 (G06) (2019–present)
 BMW 4 Series (G22) (2020–present)
 BMW i4 (G26) (2021–present)
 BMW 2 Series (G42) (2021–present)
 BMW i3 (G28) (2022–present)
 Boldmen CR4 (2022–present)
 BMW 7 Series (G70) (2022-present)

References 

Car platforms
BMW